Aasai is a 1995 Indian Tamil-language romantic thriller film, written and directed by Vasanth and produced by Mani Ratnam. The film stars Ajith Kumar and debutant Suvaluxmi, with Prakash Raj, Rohini, Poornam Viswanathan, Nizhalgal Ravi, and Vadivelu in roles. It revolves around a major lusting for his sister-in-law, and attempting to ruin her relationship with her lover.

Jeeva was the cinematographer, while Deva composed the music. The film, released on 9 September 1995, received positive reviews and went on to become a commercial success. It was remade in Hindi as Pyaar Zindagi Hai (2001).

Plot 
Saraswathi "Yamuna", the younger daughter of an Orthodox father, comes to Madras for finishing her studies. Major Madhavan, the husband of Yamuna's elder sister Ganga, gets infatuated with Yamuna after seeing her photo in a letter sent by her. Meanwhile, Yamuna meets Jeevanantham "Jeeva" in a bus, who gives his ticket to her as she had not taken her own. Later one day, Jeeva decides to express his love to Yamuna by writing in a letter and giving it to her, but he witnesses a group beating a boy who did the same, so he disposes the letter. It is found by Yamuna, who realises his love.

One day when they are walking together, Jeeva tries to remove dirt from Yamuna's eyes, and he kisses her. Yamuna is angry with him. Jeeva senses it and gets wet in the rain and gets a cold. Hearing this, Yamuna meets him. Jeeva expresses that she is the only medicine to him, and he needs her. Yamuna promises she will marry him. On Yamuna's birthday, Jeeva jumps into her house and presents her a puppy. One day, fearing that Yamuna's father might not marry him to Yamuna, he decides to marry her in a register office, but Yamuna refuses and Jeeva leaves.

Meanwhile, Madhavan settles his father-in-law's debts and earns his trust. He also pays for connecting a landline to Yamuna's house and talks to her regularly, but Ganga is unaware of this. One day, Ganga finds it, and starts to realise his true identity. Madhavan then expresses his love affair on Yamuna to his wife. This makes her so upset that she attempts to go and live with her father and Yamuna. Madhavan imprisons her in home, and one day he tells her she can go to her father's house by flight, and tricks her by making her drink a glass of milk laced with sleeping pills, as a result of which she falls unconscious. Madhavan then murders Ganga by suffocating her to death with a polythene cover and tying it around her head by his shoelace, and lies to everyone that she died from heart attack. He then makes Yamuna and her father stay with him in Delhi to look after his baby, but he has other plans.

Jeeva comes to Delhi. One day he sees Yamuna, who ignores him. Later he sees her carrying the puppy and tells why she needs the puppy when she does not need him. Yamuna leaves the puppy in the middle of the road. Later that night, Yamuna comes to take the puppy in the rain. Jeeva sees this and realises she really loves him. Two months later, Yamuna's father decides to get her married to Jeeva; Madhavan decides to stop the marriage. Yamuna's family meets Jeeva in a restaurant. While Jeeva was talking to Madhavan, he takes advantage of a careless Sikh and dashes against him, causing Jeeva to lose his balance as well. In the melee, Madhavan steals Jeeva's purse. When Jeeva senses his purse missing, he confronts the Sikh and humiliates himself, exactly as Madhavan anticipated. Later, he suspects Madhavan and wants to frisk him. This angers Yamuna's father as he blindly believes Madhavan.

Madhavan later gives Jeeva's flight ticket and wants to send him to Madras, but Jeeva fools Madhavan by tearing the ticket and spending the day with Yamuna. Enraged, Madhavan drenches his baby in the rain and calls Yamuna to look for it.  Later, Madhavan arranges for some men to pour liquor into Jeeva's mouth and lay him in the middle of the road. Madhavan makes Yamuna and her father believe Jeeva is a drunkard. The father boasts that he has the divine gift to discern good versus bad people upon sight; with that "gift", he declares Jeeva a bad person. Meanwhile, Jeeva complains to Lt. Col Hariharan, a friend of Madhavan, but he does not believe him. Later when celebrating Holi, Madhavan asks Jeeva the puppy. Jeeva gives it, but Madhavan kills the puppy and frames Jeeva. An argument ensues between them; Madhavan tries to kill Jeeva with a rod, but stops when Yamuna pleads with him.

Hariharan eventually realises the truth about Madhavan and tells him to stop. Instead, Madhavan kills Hariharan, staging it as a car accident. Madhavan plants narcotics in Jeeva's pillows and tips off the police, leading to Jeeva's arrest. While meeting Jeeva in prison, Madhavan boasts and lays the plot out to Jeeva; how he cruelly killed Ganga to get Yamuna. Yamuna overhears this and informs her father. Her father wails in agony for his murdered older daughter and his folly and poor judgement. They plan to escape, but Madhavan arrives, knocks out Yamuna's father, and holds Yamuna prisoner in his house. Jeeva escapes from prison and arrives there. A fight ensues between Madhavan and Jeeva in which Jeeva triumphs. Yamuna and Jeeva take the baby to the hospital as it fainted. Yamuna's father locks the doors, opens the gas cylinder, and lights a matchstick, causing an explosion that kills him and Madhavan. Jeeva is exonerated and unites with Yamuna and the baby.

Cast

Production

Development 
Vasanth wanted to make a "family thriller" with a powerful villain not usually seen in Tamil films; the story of Aasai evolved from this. Poovellam Kettupaar, Deva and Kanne were the working titles during the film's production but Vasanth chose Aasai as the title because it was about both the protagonist and antagonist. In creating the antagonist, Vasanth took inspiration from Rajinikanth's character from Avargal (1977) and Vijayan's character in Uthiripookkal (1979).

Casting 
The lead role of Jeevanantham was initially offered by Vasanth to actor Sivakumar's son Saravanan (later known as Suriya), to make his debut but he declined, citing a lack of interest in an acting career. He was replaced by Ajith Kumar, after Vasanth and co-producer S. Sriram saw him in a dhoti advertisement on Doordarshan. Actor Suresh dubbed Ajith's voice. For the antagonist Major Madhavan, Vasanth considered Manoj K. Jayan as one of the actors but he felt the role needed someone else, he chose Prakash Raj after he was recommended by his mentor K. Balachander. Vasanth cast Suvaluxmi as Saraswathi / Yamuna after seeing her performance in the Bengali film Uttoran and he wanted "someone who had an innocent face and could make the audience believe the gullibility of the character". Vasanth based Yamuna's father (Poornam Viswanathan) on his own father who had a tendency to trust the wrong people. Film News Anandan filmed scenes which did not make the final cut.

Filming 
Vasanth chose the Delhi backdrop because Prakash Raj's character had to be "far away from the heroine's place" and the team shot in the early mornings during their Delhi schedule as the director was "obsessive about onlookers not being part of the frame". The film's military parade scene was filmed at the Chennai branch of the Officers Training Academy after giving an assurance that the character of Madhavan had a "blemishless professional record".

Soundtrack 
The music was composed by Deva. He was chosen to compose the music because the director and the composer had earlier worked together on Doordarshan shows. To get the right music, Deva and Vasanth had pre-recording sessions to finalise the orchestration and sound of the songs. U. Srinivas played the mandolin portions in the song "Pulveli Pulveli".

Release and reception 
Aasai was released on 9 September 1995. Upon release, the film won positive reviews from critics. Ananda Vikatan, in a review dated 1 October 1995, rated the film 41 out of 100. R. P. R. of Kalki wrote without any amman dance, mother, father sentiment, action, lengthy dialogue, here comes a film after a long time that that sticks in the mind forever; the plot had an opportunity to turn vulgar, but the cursed things were deftly avoided as the director is completely focused on the finesse of carving out the characters. The film went on to win three awards at the Tamil Nadu State Awards securing honours for the Tamil Nadu State Film Award for Best Director for Vasanth, the Tamil Nadu State Film Award for Best Music Director for Deva and the Tamil Nadu State Film Award for Best Male Playback Singer for Hariharan. The film was later remade in Hindi as Pyaar Zindagi Hai (2001). The film ran for more than 210 days in theatres and emerged as a major breakthrough in Ajith's career.

References

Bibliography

External links 
 

1990s romantic thriller films
1990s Tamil-language films
1995 films
Films directed by Vasanth
Films scored by Deva (composer)
Films set in Chennai
Films shot in Agra
Indian romantic thriller films
Tamil films remade in other languages